Ice Cream Man is a studio album by American rapper Master P. It was set to be released in the summer of 1995 after he signed a deal with Priority Records. It was released on April 16, 1996. Ice Cream Man peaked at No. 6 on the Billboard Top R&B Albums chart and No. 26 on the Billboard 200. The track "The Ghetto Won't Change" was not included on the 2005 re-issue.

Track listing

Samples
"Mr. Ice Cream Man"
"Pop Goes the Weasel"; a traditional folk song
"Turn Off the Lights" by World Class Wreckin' Cru
"No More Tears"
"In the Rain" by The Dramatics
"The Ghetto Won't Change"
"Holding Back the Years" by Simply Red 
"Time To Check My Crackhouse 
"Contains audio from New Jack City

Charts

Weekly charts

Year-end charts

Certifications

References

Master P albums
1996 albums
No Limit Records albums